Sphenoptera rauca is a species of beetles in the family Buprestidae.

Subspecies
 Sphenoptera rauca rauca (Fabricius, 1787) 
 Sphenoptera rauca sexsulcata Théry, 1930

Description
Main host plants are Cynara and Eryngium.

Distribution
This species can be found in Albania, Bosnia, Bulgaria, Croatia, France, Greece, Italy, Macedonia, Portugal, Spain, formerYugoslavia and in the Near East.

References

Buprestidae
Beetles described in 1787